Grigory Kosykh (9 February 1934 – 23 February 2012) was a Soviet sports shooter and Olympic medalist. Kosykh was born in Oral, Kazakhstan, then part of the Soviet Union. He won a gold medal in the 50 metre pistol at the 1968 Summer Olympics in Mexico City.

References

1934 births
2012 deaths
Russian male sport shooters
Soviet male sport shooters
Shooters at the 1968 Summer Olympics
Shooters at the 1972 Summer Olympics
Shooters at the 1976 Summer Olympics
Olympic shooters of the Soviet Union
Olympic gold medalists for the Soviet Union
Olympic medalists in shooting
Medalists at the 1968 Summer Olympics

Medalists at the 1956 Summer Olympics